This article lists all the confirmed national football squads for the UEFA Women's Euro 1997.

Players marked (c) were named as captain for their national squad.

Group A

Head coach:  Aimé Mignot

Head coach:  Yuri Bystritsky

Head coach:  Ignacio Quereda

Head coach:  Marika Domanski-Lyfors

Sweden caps and goals based on compilation of match reports at https://www.svenskfotboll.se/landslag/dam/landskamper-1973-2000/

Group B

Head coach:  Jørgen Hvidemose

Head coach:  Tina Theune-Meyer

Head coach:  Sergio Guenza

Head coach:  Per-Mathias Høgmo

External links
 1997 - Match Details at RSSSF.com

Squads
1997